The NC State Wolfpack college football team represents North Carolina State University (NC State) in the Atlantic Division of the Atlantic Coast Conference (ACC). The Wolfpack compete as part of the NCAA Division I Football Bowl Subdivision. The program has had 36 head coaches since it began play during the 1892 season. Since December 2012, Dave Doeren has served as head coach at NC State.

Ten coaches have led NC State in postseason bowl games: Beattie Feathers, Earle Edwards, Lou Holtz, Bo Rein, Dick Sheridan, Mike O'Cain, Chuck Amato, Tom O'Brien, Dana Bible, and Doeren. Five of those coaches also won conference championships: Edward L. Greene captured one as a member of the South Atlantic Intercollegiate Athletic Association; Gus Tebell captured one as a member of the Southern Conference; and Edwards captured five, Holtz one, and Rein one as a member of the Atlantic Coast Conference.

Edwards is the leader in seasons coached with 17 years as head coach and games won with 77. Mickey Whitehurst has the highest winning percentage at 0.893. John Van Liew and Horace Hendrickson have the lowest winning percentage of those who have coached more than one game, with 0.200. Of the 36 different head coaches who have led the Wolfpack, Willie Heston, Buck Shaw, John "Clipper" Smith, Hunk Anderson, Holtz, and Sheridan have been inducted into the College Football Hall of Fame.

Key

Coaches

Notes

References

NC State

NC State Wolfpack head football coaches